Sir Hans Heysen  (8 October 18772 July 1968) was an Australian artist. He became a household name for his watercolours of monumental Australian gum trees. He is one of Australia's best known landscape painters.  Heysen also produced images of men and animals toiling in the Australian bush, as well as groundbreaking depictions of arid landscapes in the Flinders Ranges. He won the Wynne Prize for landscape painting a record nine times.

Biography
Wilhelm Ernst Hans Franz Heysen was born in Hamburg, Germany. He migrated to Adelaide in South Australia with his family in 1884 at the age of 7. As a young boy Heysen showed an early interest in art. At 14 he left school to work with a hardware merchant, later studying art during nights at Art School in his spare time, under James Ashton. He joined the Adelaide Easel Club in 1897 and was immediately recognized as a rising talent.

At age 20 he was sponsored by a group of wealthy Adelaide art enthusiasts H. H. Wigg and brothers-in-law W. L. Davidson, and F. A. Joyner, and miner Charles Henry de Rose to study art for four years in France.

By 1912 Hans Heysen had earned enough from his art to purchase a property called "The Cedars" near Hahndorf in the Adelaide Hills, which remained as his home until his death in 1968 aged 90. Hans Heysen is best remembered for his remarkable paintings depicting sheep and cattle among massive gum trees against a background of stunning atmospheric effects of light.

Family
Heysen married Selma Bartels (1878–1962) on 15 December 1904. Her father was Adolph H. F. Bartels, a former Mayor of Adelaide.
Their daughter Nora Heysen was also a successful artist.

Wynne Prize 
Heysen won the Wynne Prize nine times. His winning works were:
1904 – Mystic Morn 
1909 – Summer (watercolour) 
1911 – Hauling Timber 
1920 – Toilers (watercolour) 
1922 – The Quarry (watercolour) 
1924 – Afternoon in Autumn (watercolour) 
1926 – Farmyard, Frosty Morning 
1931 – Red Gums of the Far North (watercolour)
1932 – Brachina Gorge

Recognition
 In 1937 Heysen became an invited foundation member of, and exhibited, with Robert Menzies' anti-modernist organisation, the Australian Academy of Art.
 In 1945, he was appointed an Officer of the Order of the British Empire for service as trustee of the Hobart National Gallery
 In 1959, he was made a Knight Bachelor for service to art
 The Heysen Trail and Heysen Tunnels were named after Heysen 
 The Electoral district of Heysen in the Parliament of South Australia is named after Heysen

See also

Australian art

References

External links 

 article at the Australian Dictionary of Biography
 education kit at the National Gallery of Victoria
The three gums – Ballarat Fine Art Gallery

1877 births
1968 deaths
German emigrants to Australia
Artists from Adelaide
Australian Knights Bachelor
Australian Officers of the Order of the British Empire
Wynne Prize winners
20th-century Australian painters
20th-century Australian male artists
Australian male painters